Ralph Hartzler Fox (March 24, 1913 – December 23, 1973) was an American mathematician. As a professor at Princeton University, he taught and advised many of the contributors to the Golden Age of differential topology, and he played an important role in the modernization and main-streaming of knot theory.

Biography

Ralph Fox attended Swarthmore College for two years, while studying piano at the Leefson Conservatory of Music in Philadelphia. He earned a master's degree from Johns Hopkins University, and a PhD degree from Princeton University in 1939. His doctoral dissertation, On the Lusternick-Schnirelmann Category, was directed by Solomon Lefschetz. (In later years he disclaimed all knowledge of the Lusternik–Schnirelmann category, and certainly never published on the subject again.) He directed 21 doctoral dissertations, including those of John Milnor, John Stallings, Francisco González-Acuña, Guillermo Torres-Diaz and Barry Mazur, and supervised Ken Perko's undergraduate thesis.

He was an Invited Speaker at the International Congress of Mathematicians held in 1950 in Cambridge, Massachusetts. His mathematical contributions include Fox n-coloring of knots, the Fox–Artin arc, and the free differential calculus.  He also identified the compact-open topology on function spaces as being particularly appropriate for homotopy theory.

Aside from his strictly mathematical contributions, he was responsible for introducing several basic phrases to knot theory: the phrases slice knot, ribbon knot, and Seifert circle all appear in print for the first time under his name, and he also popularized (if he did not introduce) the phrase Seifert surface.

He popularized the playing of the game of Go at both Princeton and the Institute for Advanced Study.

Selected publications
 Introduction to Knot Theory, Richard H. Crowell and Ralph H. Fox, Reprint of the 1963 original, Graduate Texts in Mathematics, No. 57, Springer-Verlag, New York-Heidelberg, 1977. 
 "A quick trip through knot theory", in: M. K. Fort (Ed.), Topology of 3-Manifolds and Related Topics, Prentice-Hall, New Jersey, 1961, pp. 120–167.

References

External links

  Jozef H. Przytycki, Notes to the early history of the Knot Theory in Japan, 2001.

1913 births
1973 deaths
20th-century American mathematicians
Institute for Advanced Study visiting scholars
Topologists
Princeton University faculty
Swarthmore College alumni
People from Morrisville, Pennsylvania
Mathematicians from Pennsylvania